Southwestern Assemblies of God University (SAGU) is a private Christian university in Waxahachie, Texas. SAGU is accredited by the Southern Association of Colleges and Schools Commission on Colleges and officially endorsed by the Assemblies of God USA. The university offers associate, bachelor's, master's, and doctorate degrees in a variety of liberal arts programs, as well as programs in Bible and church ministries.

History

The Merger 
Southwestern Assemblies of God University began life as three separate Bible schools. The first, known as Southwestern Bible School, was established in 1927 in Enid, Oklahoma, under the leadership of the Reverend P.C. Nelson. The second, Shield of Faith Bible Institute, was founded in Amarillo, Texas, in 1931 under the direction of the Reverend Guy Shields. It included not only a Bible school, but also a grade school and a high school. The third, which was operated as Southern Bible College in connection with the Richey Evangelistic Temple, began in 1931 at Goose Creek, Texas (now Baytown), in 1931. It was started by Reverend J. T. Little in Trinity Tabernacle and moved to Houston in 1933. The school's name was then changed to Southern Bible Institute.

The Bible school division of Shield of Faith Bible Institute was moved to Fort Worth in 1935. The high school division was transferred the following year. In 1940, a merger resulted in Southern Bible Institute, moving to Fort Worth. The combined school, operating as South Central Bible Institute, came under the ownership and direction of the Texas District Council of the Assemblies of God.

The school in Enid merged with South Central in 1941, at which time the name was changed to Southwestern Bible Institute. In 1943, the institute was moved to its present facilities in Waxahachie, Texas. During the 1944–45 term, a junior college curriculum was added to the school's program. The Junior College Division soon accounted for about half of the enrollment in the College.

Becoming Southwestern Bible College 
Southwestern Bible Institute became a regional school in 1954. At that time seven districts of the Assemblies of God—Arkansas, Louisiana, New Mexico, North Texas, Oklahoma, South Texas and West Texas—owned and operated the school. In 1969, the Rocky Mountain District, composed of Colorado and Utah, was admitted to the Region. The Mississippi District was then added to the Region in 1979. In 1980, the Rocky Mountain District voted to withdraw from the Southwestern Region and to remain neutral.

The proposal to change the name of Southwestern was ratified by all seven districts, and the name became Southwestern Assemblies of God College. In 1963, the upper two years of the college were renamed Southwestern College of the Bible. In 1968, the separation of the divisions of the college was made more complete, and the Junior College was designated Southwestern Junior College of the Assemblies of God. In 1988 the two divisions were reunited.

Becoming Southwestern Assemblies of God University 

Beginning in the early nineties, Southwestern experienced phenomenal enrollment increases. From 596 students in the fall of 1991, enrollment grew to 1492 students in 1997. Along with the enrollment increase, opportunities to expand the curriculum and programs developed. In December 1994, the Board of Regents unanimously approved the name change to Southwestern Assemblies of God University to more accurately reflect its purpose and mission as a Bible university of theological and professional studies.

Harrison Graduate School 
In 1996, SAGU expanded to include a graduate school.  Approximately nineteen graduate programs are available through SAGU’s Harrison School of Graduate Studies.

Discrimination law exception
In 2015, SAGU was granted an exception to Title IX, allowing it to discriminate against LGBT students for religious reasons. In 2016, the organization Campus Pride ranked the college among the worst schools in Texas for LGBT students. SAGU responded to the negative ranking by saying that the anti-LGBT student policy is clearly articulated to prospective students before they attend.

The university's handbook lists homosexuality as an offense for which a student can be expelled. SAGU had 3 members of LGBT rights group Equality Ride arrested for trying to attend a chapel service.

Academics 
In 2004, the academic divisions of the university realigned into two colleges, the College of Bible & Church Ministries and the College of Arts & Professions.  Both colleges maintain Bible-based curriculum and strive to fulfill the mission of SAGU.

Since 2000, SAGU has added 24 new academic programs, bringing the total to more than 60 programs. Additionally, under the direction of President Kermit Bridges, the campus has continued to grow. In 2006–2007, Teeter and Bridges Halls were added. They were followed by the new Alton Garrison Student Wellness Center in 2009.

Amidst the physical expansion, SAGU experienced consecutive record enrollments in Fall 2007, Fall 2008, Fall 2009, and Fall 2010 reaching a milestone of 2,064.

Accreditation 
Southwestern Assemblies of God University is accredited by the Southern Association of Colleges and Schools Commission on Colleges (SACSCOC) to award associate, baccalaureate, masters, and doctorate degrees. Southwestern's Teacher Education Program is approved by the Texas Education Agency.

Athletics 
The Southwestern Assemblies of God (SAGU) athletic teams are called the Lions. The university is a member of the National Association of Intercollegiate Athletics (NAIA), primarily competing in the Sooner Athletic Conference (SAC) since the 2013–14 academic year. They are also a member of the National Christian College Athletic Association (NCCAA), primarily competing as an independent in the Central Region of the Division I level. The Lions previously competed in the Red River Athletic Conference (RRAC) from 1998–99 to 2012–13.

SAGU competes in 14 intercollegiate varsity sports: Men's sports include baseball, basketball, cross country, eSports, football, soccer and track & field; while women's sports include basketball, cross country, eSports, soccer, softball, track & field and volleyball. There is a cheerleading squad. The school colors are purple and gold.

Facilities
SAGU holds their football home games at Lumpkins Stadium. All other home games are played on campus.

Accomplishments

The 2012–13 school year made 2013 a record-setting year for SAGU Lions Basketball, with the Lions achieving the NAIA second-place championship ranking.

Judah the Lion
Influenced by Vice President George Brazell's acquisition of a four-month-old lion cub named Judah, Southwestern adopted the "Lion of Judah" as its mascot in 1963.

Notable alumni
Gary Elkins (BS '78), former Republican member of the Texas House of Representatives from his native Houston, Texas
Mike Evans, author, journalist, Middle East commentator.
 Jerry Lee Lewis, expelled for having played a boogie-woogie rendition of "My God Is Real".
Marlin Maddoux, conservative Christian radio host and founder of Point of View Ministries.
Mike Murdock, televangelist and contemporary Christian singer-songwriter. Left in 1966 after three semesters.

Awards
Southwestern Assemblies God University (SAGU) ranked 7th in midsize companies in The Dallas Morning News’ Top 100 Workplaces in DFW on Sunday, November 10, 2013. Winners were selected based upon survey results. Dallas Morning News ranks winners by small (less than 150 employees), midsize (150-499 employees) and large (500 employees or more) companies. This year, 276 companies were surveyed, and WorkplaceDynamics analyzed the answers from 72,285 workers to determine the Top 100.

References

External links
 
 Official athletics website

 
Sooner Athletic Conference
Universities and colleges in the Dallas–Fort Worth metroplex
Universities and colleges affiliated with the Assemblies of God
Universities and colleges accredited by the Southern Association of Colleges and Schools
Waxahachie, Texas
Education in Ellis County, Texas
Buildings and structures in Ellis County, Texas
Educational institutions established in 1927
1927 establishments in Texas
Private universities and colleges in Texas